"Freakin' Out" is a song by Graham Coxon and was released as the lead single from his fifth solo album Happiness in Magazines in 2004 (see 2004 in British music). It was released as a very limited 7" (only 5000 copies) and charted at number 37 in the UK Singles Chart. "Freakin' Out" was later re-released as a double A-side with "All Over Me" (see Freakin' Out / All Over Me). For many years, it has been used as the theme song in the opening titles of G-Spot, an entertainment/ents programme broadcast by Glasgow University Student Television.

The limited 7" (which made the song a #37) was the first single since the 2002 release of "In the City" by The Jam to chart in the UK Top 40 solely on a limited 7" release. It is also the second single after "In the City", that peaked at #36, to chart on a limited 7" in the UK Top 40 since the late 1970s.

Track listing
CD CDRDJ6632
"Freakin' Out"

7" R6632
"Freakin' Out" 
"Feel Right"

External links
Official discography link
Fansite singles discography link 

2004 singles
Graham Coxon songs
Songs written by Graham Coxon
Song recordings produced by Stephen Street
2004 songs
Parlophone singles